George W. Fraley (April 4, 1931 – August 24, 2016) was an American politician. He served in the Tennessee House of Representatives from 1996 to 2010. Previously, he served as County Executive of Franklin County, Tennessee from 1990 to 1994, and as county commissioner from 1969 to 1982. He died in 2016 in Nashville after a cerebral hemorrhage.

References

Members of the Tennessee House of Representatives
1931 births
2016 deaths